= Semra Saiyad =

- village
- Location within Madhya Pradesh Location within India
- Coordinates: 23.3462464°N 77.4386429°E
- Country: India
- State: Madhya Pradesh
- District: Bhopal
- Tehsil: Huzur
- Elevation: 484 m (1,588 ft)

Population (2011)
  - Total: 644
- Time zone: UTC+5:30 (IST)
- ISO 3166 code: MP-IN
- 2011 census code: 482421

Semra Saiyad is a village in the Bhopal district of Madhya Pradesh, India. It is located in the Huzur tehsil and the Phanda block.

== Demographics ==
According to the 2011 census of India, Semra Saiyad has 114 households. The effective literacy rate (i.e. the literacy rate of population excluding children aged 6 and below) is 70.78%.

Demographics (2011 Census)
	Total	Male	Female
Population	644	354	290
Children aged below 6 years	93	58	35
Scheduled caste	21	11	10
Scheduled tribe	1	1	0
Literates	390	229	161
Workers (all)	410	234	176
Main workers (total)	291	194	97
Main workers: Cultivators	125	89	36
Main workers: Agricultural labourers	142	85	57
Main workers: Household industry workers	0	0	0
Main workers: Other	24	20	4
Marginal workers (total)	119	40	79
Marginal workers: Cultivators	63	17	46
Marginal workers: Agricultural labourers	53	23	30
Marginal workers: Household industry workers	0	0	0
Marginal workers: Others	3	0	3
Non-workers	234	120	114
